This is a list of Greek football transfers for the 2008 summer transfer window. Only moves featuring at least one Super League Greece club are listed.

Transfers

References

Greek
Football Transfers Summer 2008
2008